JD Motorsport is an auto racing team based in Vespolate, Italy that competes in formula single-seaters in Europe.

History
The team was formed in the 1995 by Roberto Cavallari and Alfredo Cappelletti. In 1996 the team started to participate in Formula Renault 2000 Eurocup and had four consecutive titles with Enrique Bernoldi, Jeffrey van Hooydonk, Bruno Besson and Gianmaria Bruni.

In 2000 the team expanded their campaign to the Italian Formula Renault Championship, but in 2001 decided to switch in the German Championship. Here the squad had two successive titles with Marcel Lasée and Christian Klien. In 2005 JD Motorsport returned to the Italian championship before joining Formula Renault 2.0 Northern European Cup in 2006.

In 2007, the team left Formula Renault category to compete in the International Formula Master. On the next year the team sealed the drivers' title with Chris van der Drift and teams' titles in 2008 and 2009. But in 2010 International Formula Master was folded and the team joined new-for-2010 Formula Abarth category. In 2011, JD Motorsport expanded their operations into the Italian Formula Three Championship, winning the final season in the history of the championship with Riccardo Agostini.

In 2013, the team returned to Formula Renault 2.0 Northern European Cup and also had part-time campaign in the Formula Renault 2.0 Alps. But for 2014 it was decided to concentrate on the Alps series. The team with help from Matevos Isaakyan finished third in both the drivers' and teams' championship.

Former series results

Formula Renault Eurocup

† Includes points scored with other teams

Eurocup Formula Renault

† Includes points scored with other teams

Formula Regional European Championship

† Includes points scored with other teams

Timeline

References

External links
 
 

Italian auto racing teams
Formula Renault Eurocup teams
Italian Formula 3 teams
International Formula Masters teams
Auto racing teams established in 1995
Formula Regional European Championship teams